The Freeman-Hurt House near Oakman, Georgia is listed on the National Register of Historic Places.  The property includes five contributing buildings.  It includes Dogtrot architecture.

The house was built by a Cherokee  named Burdine Swann, according to a direct descendant, and the house was built before 1832.

References

Houses on the National Register of Historic Places in Georgia (U.S. state)
Houses completed in 1832
National Register of Historic Places in Gordon County, Georgia
Dogtrot architecture in Georgia (U.S. state)
Houses in Gordon County, Georgia